Lev Levanda (June 1835 – 18 June 1888) was a Russian author, belletrist, and publicist. His sketches were often published under the pen name Ladnev. 

Levnada's literary work made him a leading figure in the circles of the Russian-Jewish intelligentsia. Originally a vocal proponent of the assimilation of Jews into Russian culture, Levanda became a strong supporter of their emigration to Palestine following the 1881–82 pogroms across the Russian Empire.

Biography

Early life
Lev Levanda was born to a poor Jewish family in Minsk, Russian Empire (now Belarus). After spending three years at a state-sponsored school for Jews in his hometown, he entered the Vilna Rabbinical School in 1849, graduating in 1854 with a teacher's diploma. He thereafter returned to Minsk and was appointed a teacher at the government-run Jewish school. He taught there until 1860, when he was appointed uchonyi evrei ('adviser on Jewish affairs') to the Governor-General of Vilna, Mikhail N. Muravyov, a position he held until his death. In this role he assisted with programs to study Jewish life and edited Russian-language state textbooks for Jewish children. Levanda was instrumental in exposing false witnesses in a ritual-murder trial of several Jews from the shtetl of Shavl in 1861.

Vilna
Upon his arrival in Vilna, Levanda participated in the publication of the first Russian-language Jewish journal,  ('Dawn'), edited in Odessa by Osip Rabinovich, as well as its successor, Zion. His first novel, Shop of Imported Far-East Groceries, appeared in the pages of Rassvet in 1860. Levanda's The Warehouse of Groceries: Pictures of the Jewish Life, a work of belles lettres, was serialized in Rassvet, and published as a book in 1869 (a Hebrew translation was published five years later).

A supporter of the Russification of Eastern European Jewry, in 1864 Levanda was appointed editor of the region's official newspaper, Vilenskie gubernskie vedomosti ('Vilna Provincial News'), with a mandate to justify Muravyov's russifying campaign. Following the banning of Rassvet and Zion, he began to contribute under a pseudonym to a number of liberal Russian newspapers in St. Petersburg and Vilna, including the Sankt-Peterburgskie Vedomosti. In a series of articles, Levanda argued that the acquisition of civil rights hinged on the assimilation of the Jewish masses into Russian culture.

In the 1870s and 1880s, he contributed to the Russian Jewish journals  (Еврейская библиотека, 'The Jewish Library'),  ('The Russian Jew'), and Voskhod ('Sunrise'). In 1876 he published a collection of sketches under the title "Sketches of the Past," followed later by a number of stories, such as "The Four Tutors" and "The Amateur Performance", in Russkii evrei, Yevreiskoe Obozrenie ('The Jewish Review'), and Voskhod. He published over twenty articles on Jewish life in Poland with the title "The Vistula Chronicle" in Russkii evrei.

He published his best-known work, Seething Times, set in the northern Pale of Settlement against the background of the Polish Uprising of 1863, in three instalments between 1871 and 1873 in Evreiskaia biblioteka. In the novel, young Westernized Jews were urged by the hero, Sarin, to abandon Polish orientation (after 500 years of unhappy experience with the Poles) and become Russians. The book was released as a book in 1875 under the title Seething Times: The Novel of the Last Polish Uprising.

Final years
Levanda's political views changed dramatically following the 1881–82 pogroms across the Russian Empire, and the Russian state's hostile indifference to them. With the subsequent rapid growth in Polish anti-Semitism, Levanda began writing about the rebuilding of a Jewish state in Palestine. He became a leading activist for the Hibbat Zion movement and maintained close links with Leon Pinsker, author of the influential Zionist manifesto Auto-Emancipation. In "The Essence of the So-Called 'Palestine' Movement" (1884), Levanda discussed the ideas of Jewish self-determination as a "practical solution" to a "vicious cycle," and in 1885 published an important reconsideration of the position of the Jews in Russia, entitled "On 'Assimilation'".

In early 1887, his mental condition began to deteriorate sharply, showing signs of major depressive disorder. As a result, he was transported that May to St. Petersburg, where he was placed in a psychiatric hospital. He died there less than a year later.

Reception and legacy
Although a popular writer, contemporary critics considered Levanda untalented and unrefined.

An elegy in Levanda's memory, in Yiddish and Russian with accompaniment on the piano, was published in Vilna upon his death.

Partial bibliography

 
 
 
 
 
 
  (With S. J. Fuenn and Kh. L. Katsenelenbogen.)

References
 

1835 births
1888 deaths
19th-century novelists from the Russian Empire
Hovevei Zion
Jewish educators
Jewish Russian writers
Lithuanian Jews
Novelists from the Russian Empire
Russian historical novelists
Russian male novelists
Russian nationalists
Russian Zionists
Vilna Rabbinical School alumni
Writers from Minsk
Writers from Vilnius
Yiddish-language writers